Line 2 (Green) is one of the six lines that make up the São Paulo Metro and one of the thirteen lines that make up the Metropolitan Rail Transportation Network. It currently runs between the Vila Madalena and Vila Prudente stations. The line is also called the Paulista Line, because it goes along much of the Avenida Paulista, one of the leading financial centers in São Paulo. Despite being the second line to be planned, it was the third to be built—the second line built was actually Line 3 (Red). This line connects West to South-East regions.

History

The first section of Line 2 (Green Line), initially called the Paulista Line, was built using the New Austrian Tunnelling Method. With this line the metro system was extended to include a major axis of the expanded center of São Paulo, with a large concentration of financial institutions, hospitals, schools, hotels, consulates, offices of state radio and television, theaters and museums. In 1998 two new stations (Vila Madalena and Santuário Nossa Senhora de Fátima-Sumaré) were completed, adding a further  stretch.

On March 30, 2006 the then Governor Geraldo Alckmin on his last day in office opened the Santos-Imigrantes station.

Jose Serra published a decree and authorization to extend the line to Vila Prudente, adding the Sacomã, Tamanduateí and Vila Prudente stations.

On May 10, 2007, during the Papal visit of Benedict XVI to the city of São Paulo, Line 2 had the highest demand of its history up until then, carrying 370,226 passengers. During the weekend of May 17–18, 2008 Line 2 was temporarily shut down between the stations Clínicas and Consolação to allow the use of a tunnel boring machine just seven meters below the level of its tunnel being used for the extension project of Line 4 (Yellow). The current record of passengers carried by the line was on May 7, 2008, with 428,056 passengers.

On March 28, 2009, the first of the sixteen new trains came into operation for the inauguration of the Sacomã - Vila Prudente stretch. On January 10, 2010, Sacomã station was opened to the public, initially only in operation from 10:30 to 15:00 and then from the 22nd, from 10:00 to 16:00. Finally, on the 30th of that month, it was fully opened to the public. Although the extension project of Line 2 was the only one to receive the whole amount in 2009, the schedule was delayed—the opening of the Tamanduateí and Vila Prudente stations originally scheduled for March 2010 was postponed.  On August 18 it was announced that the opening of Vila Prudente station would happen just three days later. On September 21, the Tamanduateí station opened.

Stations

The Santos-Imigrantes station is semi-elevated with metal and concrete structures that support the roof of the station. The Santuário Nossa Senhora de Fátima-Sumaré station is elevated and situated in a valley (under the Dr. Arnold viaduct). The Tamanduateí station is elevated with concrete structures mixed with metal, supporting the arched ceiling. All other stations are underground. The Trianon-Masp, Consolação, Brigadeiro, Ana Rosa, Chácara Klabin, and Santos-Imigrantes stations are composed of core platforms. The others are just side platforms.

The line also integrates with Line 15 (Silver) and the extension of Line 5 (Lilac).

 Note: Stations in bold are under construction; stations in italic are in planning.

Expansion plans

Vila Prudente ↔ Cidade Tiradentes
In May 2009 a joint delegation of the city and the state of São Paulo visited the monorail system in Tokyo to begin planning the implementation of a monorail to extend Line 2 (Green) from Vila Prudente to Cidade Tiradentes. On November 6, 2009, international bidding was opened in order to build the monorail system. On November 23, 2009, construction on the Vila Prudente-Oratório was started. The line is projected to carry around 510,000 passengers daily.

However, it was decided in September 2012, that the eastward extension monorail to Cidade Tiradentes will be named Line 15, and Line 2 will be extended northwards from Vila Prudente to Dutra. Funds were approved in mid-2012 for the first section, which includes the Orfanato, Santa Clara, Anália Franco and Vila Formosa stations. This section is expected to open in 2017 or 2018.

Vila Madalena ↔ Cerro Corá
In addition, there are plans to expand Line 2 (Green)  from Vila Madalena station to Avenida Cerro Corá, in the neighborhood of Lapa.

References

Line 02
Sao 02
Railway lines opened in 1991